WROR-FM (105.7 FM) – branded as 105.7 WROR – is a commercial classic hits radio station licensed to Framingham, Massachusetts. Owned by the Beasley Broadcast Group, the station serves Greater Boston and much of surrounding New England, including portions of the Portsmouth and Providence radio markets. The WROR studios are located in the Boston suburb of Waltham, while the station transmitter resides on the Prudential Tower in Downtown Boston. WROR is continually ranked as one of the highest-rated radio stations in the Boston media market, as well as one of the highest-rated classic hits stations in the United States.

WROR's transmitter is on the lower FM mast of the Prudential Tower in Downtown Boston. The signal reaches as far north as Portsmouth, New Hampshire, and as far south as Providence, Rhode Island. Besides a standard analog transmission, WROR broadcasts in HD Radio, and is available online.

History

WKOX-FM (1960–1971)

The station signed on as WKOX-FM on February 10, 1960, the FM companion of WKOX (1190 AM). Initially a simulcast of WKOX's daytime programming, WKOX-FM exclusively aired classical music programming at night, oriented towards Boston's MetroWest suburbs.

In January 1969, the station began broadcasting a top 40/album rock format as The New FM 105, and then later as FM Stereo 105. WKOX-FM was the Boston area's first FM top 40 station featuring live disc jockeys, including hosts Bill Thomas, Brother Bill Heizer, FM Douglas, program director Dick Stevens, John Leisher, Alan Fraser, J. William Charles, with Kenny McKay and Jimmy Conlee. WKOX-FM converted to stereo broadcasting that July.

WVBF (1971–1993)

WKOX and WKOX-FM were acquired by Fairbanks Communications in July 1971. After the sale, WKOX-FM became WVBF (also known as the Electronic Mama), as a hybrid top 40/rock station, initially retaining some of the WKOX-FM personalities. The call letters officially stood for "Welcome, Virginia Brown Fairbanks", the wife of station owner Richard M. Fairbanks; Richard also had a station named after himself, WRMF in West Palm Beach. WVBF improved its signal coverage, targeting the Greater Boston area. Some hosts added to WVBF during their early months included Buddy Ballou, John "Big John" Gillis, Bill "BLF Bash" Freeman and Charlie Kendall.

During Fairbanks ownership in the 1970s, WVBF evolved from being a high energy top 40/rock hybrid station in 1971–1972, to becoming a mainstream top 40 station by 1975, and eventually evolved into a hot adult contemporary format over the years. WVBF also had many different nicknames in that era, including WVBF FM 105, WVBF Stereo 105, F105 WVBF and The New WVBF Boston 105.

WVBF debuted a morning show in 1981 hosted by the team of Loren Owens and Wally Brine; eventually joined on-air by character actor/parody musician Tom Doyle, newscaster Lauren Beckham Falcone, traffic reporter Hank Morse and producer Brian "Lung Boy" Bell. Loren and Wally would continue to air on the station even with multiple ownership, format and call letter changes until 2019, despite Brine's retirement in 2016.

In the early 1990s, Delilah was a host on WVBF before she moved to Seattle and entered national syndication.

WCLB/WKLB (1993–1996)
 

On February 12, 1993, citing the growing popularity of country music, WVBF became WCLB, "The Country Club". The format change was made in an effort to throw off Greater Media from launching a country format on newly acquired WCDJ (96.9 FM); that station went forward with its format switch, becoming WBCS, anyway. Arbitron diary confusion with television station WCVB-TV (as "L" and "V" could read similar in handwriting) led to WCLB changing its call sign to WKLB in 1995.

In 1995, WKLB was to be sold to Evergreen Media, and was widely expected to become a talk station. However, a series of subsequent trades in 1996 placed WKLB under common ownership with WBCS via Greater Media.

On August 24, 1996, the intellectual property of WKLB "merged" with WBCS, with the newly merged country station utilizing the 96.9 frequency of WBCS along with the WKLB call letters, combining personalities from both stations. Some WKLB personalities remained at the station for the new format, including Loren and Wally. The two stations simulcast for eleven days.

WROR (1996–present)
After the simulcast ended, on September 5, 1996, Greater Media changed WKLB's call letters to WROR, and changed the station's format to oldies. The WROR callsign had previously been used on 98.5 FM until 1991, later being been "parked" first on WMFN (640 AM) in Zeeland, Michigan, then on WROR (1150 AM); the latter was also owned by Greater Media at the time.

The "new" WROR played 1970s pop and rock oldies, disco, some 1960s oldies, 1980s soft rock and top-40 crossovers, along with some classic rock, and hired several staffers connected to the "old" WROR. Leading broadcasters involved with WROR in the 1970s and early 1980s included program director Gary Berkowitz and personalities such as: Joe Martell, Phil Redo, Larry Justice, Frank Kingston Smith, and former WROR general manager Tom Baker.

By 1999, the format had been modified to classic rock, similar to co-owned WMGK in Philadelphia, but gradually moved back to more of a pop-based classic hits format in 2006, emphasizing pop adult rock hits while mixing in some R&B, disco, and harder rock songs. The station continues to emphasize the 1970s and 1980s, but also plays some well-known 1990s hits and two 1960s songs: Van Morrison's "Brown Eyed Girl" and Norman Greenbaum's "Spirit in the Sky" (although the latter was released as a single in the US in early 1970). WROR became the market's lone classic hits station in 2012 following WODS's format switch to top 40. The Lost 45s hosted by Barry Scott returned to WROR on September 2, 2012 (it has been on the station before it went to rival Oldies 103.3 in 2001), before being dropped in April 2014.

On July 19, 2016, Beasley Media Group announced it would acquire Greater Media and its 21 stations (including WROR) for $240 million. The FCC approved the sale on October 6, 2016, and the sale closed on November 1, 2016. Following Beasley's acquisition of WBZ-FM in 2017, WROR-FM began broadcasting Boston Celtics games that conflict with broadcasts of the Boston Bruins or the New England Patriots; WBZ-FM is the flagship station for all three teams.

Tom Doyle was let go from the morning show on November 19, 2014; in December 2016, Wally Brine announced his retirement. Hank Morse was let go on June 24, 2019, four days before Owens retired, citing an inability to reach terms on a contract extension. Bob Bronson, formerly of WLTW in New York City and WZID in Manchester, was teamed up with Loren and Wally holdovers Lauren Beckham Falcone and Brian Bell.

In October 2022, Beasley Media made many staff cuts across the country. This included at WROR, where morning show producer Brian Bell and midday host Julie Devereaux were laid off. Bell had been with the station since 1995, while Devereaux since 2000. Beasley also laid off WROR program director Ken West.

Christmas music
From 2007 through 2011, WROR would switch to an all Christmas music format throughout the holiday season; the station would also air a nightly call-in program for children hosted by "Santa Claus". After WODS's 2012 format switch, then-sister station WMJX assumed the role of playing Christmas music annually.

Loren and Wally
The station may be best known for its former morning team, Loren Owens and Wally Brine, co-starring Tom Doyle who contributed character voices and parody songs, along with Lauren Beckham Falcone reporting news and Hank Morse with traffic, and produced by Brian "Lung Boy" Bell. (Doyle was let go on November 19, 2014.) The program aired on the station since 1981 (when it was still WVBF).

In December 2016, Wally Brine announced his retirement.  Hank Morse was let go on June 24, 2019, a few days before the show concluded.  Owens did his final show on June 28, 2019, citing an inability to reach terms on a contract extension.  WROR now has "The ROR Morning Show" as its wake-up program, hosted by Bob Bronson (formerly with WLTW New York City and WZID Manchester, New Hampshire) joined by Lauren Beckham Falcone as co-host and Brian Bell as producer.

The Loren & Wally Show had several segments:

Men from Maine
Men from Maine was a one- to two-minute comedy segment, opening with soap opera organ music and Loren stating something varying along the lines of, "Welcome to another thrilling episode of the exciting adventures of Men from Maine. As today's action packed drama begins...". Episodes typically revolve around the two main characters Lem (played by Tom) and Ephus (played by Wally), and other residents of Bangor, Maine, such as Ephus' wife Effie and son Ephus Junior, Doc Cider (after Dock Sider shoes) and Pastor Fazool (after pasta e fagioli). The same characters have been used in songs about Maine on the segment "Tom's Townie Tunes" (see below). The humor of the segment is at its root generic "redneck humor", but set in very rural, backwoods Maine as opposed to the American South. Episode themes can run all the way from industrial accidents handled in incompetent ways (many residents, including Lem and Ephus work in the local sawmill), to bestiality. In all cases, the humor comes from the stupidity of the characters, and their obliviousness to it. Every episode ends with the characters going "Ayuh!"

At least one listener has found the show offensive, as heard on the first Men from Maine CD (sold during the holiday season to raise money for charity). Offended by the humor poking fun at her home state, a woman called the station, threatening to continue protesting the show until it is taken off the air. But the segment continued on the Loren and Wally show until Owens' departure from the program. Some can still be found as a "Loren & Wally Podcast of the Day" on iTunes and 2 episodes are posted on YouTube.

Tom's Townie Tunes
Tom's Townie Tunes is a segment created by morning crew member Tom Doyle that spoofs classic rock hits, using humorous lyrics to poke fun at towns in Massachusetts (and an additional few songs about the surrounding region, such as Maine). Often the songs are about high crime rates, poverty, and the general misery of residents in low class areas, while other songs satirize Harvard graduates and Kerry Healey's failed run for Governor of Massachusetts (sung to the tune of "867-5309 (Jenny)" by Tommy Tutone). The first ever Townie Tune was about Provincetown, Massachusetts (sung to the tune of Funkytown). Doyle's sports-related songs have occasionally gained airplay on other stations during championship seasons. During the holiday season, Tom often sings parodies of classic Christmas songs.

Other Townie Tunes include:

Current programming
 D.J.s include Bob Bronson, Lauren Beckham Falcone, Brian Bell, Julie Devereaux, and Jaybeau Jones. The station was the Boston affiliate for Little Steven's Underground Garage on Sunday nights until June 7, 2020.

The station now focuses on hit songs from the 1970s, the 1980s, and some 1990s hits. Its slogan is “80s & more!” Therefore, the station has an emphasis on 80s music.

The HD2 digital subchannel once broadcast a classic rock format under the brand "The Bone". Previous formats on WROR-HD2 have included all-comedy and 70s hits, respectively.

In July 2019, the HD2 subchannel flipped to a loop of “Men from Maine” segments from the Loren and Wally archive. As of March 2020, the HD2 subchannel was removed.

References

External links

ROR
ROR
Classic hits radio stations in the United States
Radio stations established in 1960
Framingham, Massachusetts
Mass media in Middlesex County, Massachusetts
1960 establishments in Massachusetts